Acmispon wrangelianus is a species of legume native to California and Oregon in the southwestern United States. It is known by the common names Chilean bird's-foot trefoil and Chile lotus. Despite its common name, it is not from Chile. It can be found in many types of habitat, including disturbed areas. This is a hairy, prostrate annual herb. Its slender branches are lined with leaves each made of generally four small leaflets. The inflorescence is composed of a solitary yellow pealike flower around a centimeter wide.

References

External links
Jepson Manual Treatment
USDA Plants Profile
Photo gallery

wrangelianus
Flora of California
Flora of Oregon